Bruckmühl is a market town in the district of Rosenheim, in Bavaria, Germany. It is situated on the river Mangfall, 16 km west of Rosenheim.

References